The Stawell Gold Mine (SGM) is a gold mine located in the town of Stawell, Victoria. The current site was established in 1981, however mining has occurred on and around the site since the town was established in the mid 19th century.

The mine reaches depths of up to 1.6 Kilometers (0.99 Miles).

For a long time, the Stawell operations were closely related with those at the Fosterville Gold Mine outside Bendigo, however this changed when Arete Capital Partners purchased Stawell, but left Fosterville in the hands of Kirkland Lake Gold (Now Agnico Eagle Mines Ltd.).

History 

Crocodile Gold obtained the mine in 2012. At a stage under ownership of Croc Gold, the mine was planned to transition to an open cut style of mine, however environmental agencies restricted this from happening, as it would have involved inverting Stawell's big hill, a local landmark

The mine transitioned into the hands of Newmarket Gold Inc. in July 2015, after Crocodile Gold Corp. and it's assets were absorbed into the company.

In 2016, under the ownership of Newmarket Gold's successor, Kirkland Lake Gold, the mine ceased underground mining, laying off around 150 staff, leaving the mine in a limbo state

In 2017, the Arete Capital partners obtained a controlling share in the company, going on to examine the path the mine would take in the future to maximise production, with restoring and servicing all the mines production assets, the mine would go on to reopen fully in early 2019, with the first gold pour since the closure occurring that February.

In 2019, construction on the Stawell Underground Physics Laboratory (SUPL), commenced 1 km below surface level inside the mine, the facility opened in August 2022.

References 

Gold mines in Australia
Stawell, Victoria